is a Japanese actor represented by Wonder Production.

Filmography

Films

TV series

Advertisements

References

External links
 

1952 births
Living people
Male actors from Tokyo